Magnanime was a  74-gun ship of the line of the French Navy.

Her keel was laid in June 1802, and she was launched in Rochefort on 18 August 1803.

She took part in Allemand's expedition of 1805 under Captain Pierre-Francois Violette.

She was decommissioned in 1816.

See also
 List of ships of the line of France

References

 

Ships of the line of the French Navy
Téméraire-class ships of the line
1803 ships
Ships built in France